Georgius Tzul (also Georgios) was a Khazar warlord against whom the Byzantine Empire and Mstislav of Tmutarakan launched a joint expedition in 1016. 

He appears only in the account of the Byzantine court historians Kedrenos and John Skylitzes, who place him at Kerch and calls him "khagan" (the title of the Khazar emperors). Kedrenos states that he was captured by the expeditionary force but does not relate his ultimate fate. Inscriptions and other references exist referring to a Tzul or Tsal clan in Crimea during this period; presumably he was a member although the relationship of that family to the original ruling dynasty of Khazaria is unknown. Almost nothing else about him, including the extent of his holdings, is known.

Despite the fact that earlier writers maintained that the Khazar khagan was required to adhere to Judaism, Georgius is a Christian name. Whether Georgius Tzul was himself a Christian, a Jew or Shamanist with an unusual Greek name, or whether the name is merely a Byzantine attempt to transliterate a Turkic or Hebrew name, is unknown.

Byzantine campaigns occurred roughly during this period against the Georgians and the Bulgarian Empire, suggesting a concerted effort to re-establish Byzantine dominance in the Black Sea region.

References 

Kevin Alan Brook. The Jews of Khazaria. 2nd ed. Rowman & Littlefield Publishers, Inc, 2006.

Turkic rulers
Khazar rulers
11th century in the Byzantine Empire
Medieval Crimea
11th-century rulers in Europe